Samuel Adams Wiggin (1832–1899) was an American poet, born in Portsmouth, New Hampshire, on May 27, 1832.

Wiggin pursued a military career until Vice President Andrew Johnson became president after the assassination of Abraham Lincoln in 1865. He was then appointed executive clerk or private secretary to President Johnson, a position which he held for eight years and three months.

He died on July 15, 1899, at his home, named Fernwood, in Washington, DC, following a fall down a flight of stairs.

Poetry
Many of his poems were published in newspapers of the day and were written in Poets' Corner in the White House. His published work has over 200 poems, including a satirical piece against Darwin's On the Origin of Species. Other subjects include patriotism, the Rebellion (civil war), slavery, religious matters and various family members.

References

1832 births
1899 deaths
19th-century American poets
American male poets
19th-century American male writers